Giles Yeo  is the Professor of Molecular Neuroendocrinology at the MRC Metabolic Diseases Unit and Scientific Director of the Genomics/Transcriptomics Core at the University of Cambridge.

Early life and education
He was born in London and lived in Singapore, San Francisco, United States, and since 1994 has been based in Cambridge, United Kingdom. In 1994 he graduated from University of California, Berkeley (Molecular and Cell Biology) and in 1997 he completed a PhD study at University of Cambridge (Molecular genetics). His focus is on the study of obesity, brain control of body weight and genetic influences on appetitive behaviour.

Career

Media
He has presented three BBC Horizon documentaries: Why Are We Getting So Fat? (2016), Clean Eating: The Dirty Truth (2017) and Vitamin Pills: Miracle or Myth? (2018). Giles was also a presenter on BBC Two's Trust Me, I'm A Doctor.  His first book, Gene Eating: The Story Of Human Appetite was published in December 2018. His second book, Why Calories Don't Count, was published in June 2021. Giles also presented Plant Based Promises, a three-part BBC Radio 4 programme in JuneJuly 2022. He also hosts the podcast Dr Giles Yeo Chews The Fat.

Academic positions 
Yeo has held the following posts at the University of Cambridge:
from December 1998: Research Associate at Cambridge Institute for Medical Research
from December 2007: Scientific Director of Genomics/Transcriptomics at Institute for Metabolic Science
from September 2009: Graduate Tutor at Wolfson College, Cambridge
from September 2014: Principal Research Associate at MRC Metabolic Diseases Unit
from August 2022: Professor of Molecular Neuroendocrinology at MRC Metabolic Diseases Unit

Honours and public appearances 
In November 2019 Giles was the winner of the centenary year The Genetics Society JBS Haldane Lecture, which ‘recognises an individual for outstanding ability to communicate topical subjects in genetics research, widely interpreted, to an interested lay audience’. His Haldane Lecture was entitled 'Is Obesity A Choice', and was given at The Royal Institution in London on November 27, 2019.  In October 2020 he was awarded an MBE in the Queen's 2020 Birthday Honours for services to 'Research, Communication and Engagement'. In January 2021 he was a guest on the BBC Radio 4 programme The Life Scientific. He was awarded The Society for Endocrinology medal in 2022.
Dr Giles Yeo has been the honorary president of the British Dietetic Association since 2019

See also 
Obesity

References 

UC Berkeley College of Letters and Science alumni
Alumni of the University of Cambridge
Members of the Order of the British Empire
Living people
Year of birth missing (living people)